Arizona Opera is an opera company which operates in both Phoenix and Tucson, Arizona.

History
Arizona Opera was established in 1971 as the Tucson Opera Company, under founding general director James P. Sullivan, and presented its first production, of Rossini's The Barber of Seville, in 1972. By 1976 the company had expanded to include performances in both Tucson and Phoenix. Arizona Opera is now permanently headquartered in Phoenix. The company has a subscriber base of approximately 10,000 drawn from the two metropolitan areas, and an annual expenditure of $5.8 million, according to the company's 2011 IRS Form 990. According to the Form 990 filed by the company in 2017, revenues for the 2016 tax year were $7,704,444 and expenses were $6,211,715.

The appointment of Glynn Ross as general director in 1983 initiated a period of growth during which the company expanded its season from three to five productions. In 1996 and 1998 the company gained notice by staging Wagner's Ring Cycle as a summer festival in Flagstaff, Arizona. Ross retired in 1998 and was succeeded by David Speers, who increased spending on rehearsals, chorus, and orchestra in an effort to improve the quality of the company's productions. Under Speers' leadership subscriptions and single-ticket sales increased. In addition to the company's regular productions, Speers brought singers Samuel Ramey, Kiri Te Kanawa, Denyce Graves, and Jerry Hadley to Arizona for recital performances.

During the 2000–2001 season, the company appointed its first principal conductor, Cal Stewart Kellogg. Kellogg remained in that position through 2004, and is now director of the Symphony of the Southwest.

David Speers left the company in 2003 and was succeeded by Joel Revzen, a Juilliard-trained musician, conductor, and music-organization administrator. Revzen continued Speers' practice of mixing standard repertory with productions of less-often-performed works, e.g., Menotti's The Consul, Brecht and Weill's The Threepenny Opera, and Handel's Semele. Revzen was succeeded as general director by Scott Altman in 2009, and Revzen has been named the company's conductor laureate. Altman oversaw the design and construction of the company's new office and production complex, the Arizona Opera Center, across Central Avenue from the Phoenix Art Museum in midtown Phoenix. The company announced Altman's resignation in April 2013. Arizona Opera artistic director Ryan Taylor was appointed interim general director upon Altman's departure, and then permanent general director in June 2013. Arizona Opera's current President and General Director is Joseph Specter, who was appointed in May 2016.

In February–May 2017 Arizona Opera presented the world premiere of Craig Bohmler's opera Riders of the Purple Sage, based on  Zane Grey's novel of the same name. The production was also broadcast nationwide on November 25, 2017 on the WFMT Radio Network's American Opera Series, and broadcast internationally in 2018 via distribution to the European Broadcasting Union.

In late 2017, Arizona Opera announced a shift from their traditional season model. While retaining five productions per opera season, the fall and spring performances were split into two distinct performance series.

Arizona Opera offers five productions with five performances each per season. The McDougall Arizona Opera RED Series is performed in the fall at the Herberger Theater Center (802 seats) in Phoenix and The Temple of Music and Art in Tucson (627 seats). The spring Main Stage Series is presented at Phoenix Symphony Hall (2,312 seats) and the Tucson Convention Center Music Hall (2,289 seats).

Labor relations
The Arizona Opera Chorus is composed of professional singers from both Phoenix and Tucson.  Choristers have been affiliated with the American Guild of Musical Artists (AGMA) since 1995. Union representation has resulted in improvements in chorus compensation and working conditions, and a concomitant improvement in the quality of new chorister candidates.

The Arizona Opera Orchestra is composed of music professionals from three major cities in Arizona — Phoenix, Tucson, and Flagstaff — and is affiliated with the American Federation of Musicians (AFM). Like the chorus, union representation resulted in improvements in working conditions under a collective bargaining agreement. In 1998 orchestra members formed the Arizona Opera Orchestra Musicians Association (AZOOMA) to support the musicians and the company.

General directors
 James P. Sullivan (1971–1981)
 Richard J Woitach (1981–1983)
 Glynn Ross (1983–1998)
 David Speers (1998–2003)
 Joel Revzen (2003–2009)
 Scott Altman (2009–2013)
 Ryan Taylor (2013–2016)
 Joseph Specter (2016–present)

References

External links
 Arizona Opera
 Phoenix Symphony Hall
 Tucson Music Hall
 Herberger Theater

Musical groups established in 1971
Music of Phoenix, Arizona
American opera companies
Music of Tucson, Arizona
Performing arts in Arizona
1971 establishments in Arizona